Kungumam Kathai Solgirathu is a 1978 Indian Tamil-language film directed by K. Shankar. The film stars M. G. Sukumaran and Fatafat Jayalaxmi. It is the former's first film as lead actor. The film was released on 23 December 1978 and failed at the box office.

Plot

Cast 
 M. G. Sukumaran
 Fatafat Jayalaxmi

Production 
Kungumam Kathai Solgirathu is the first film for Sukumaran as lead actor.

Soundtrack 
The music was composed by M. S. Viswanathan.

Release and reception 
Kungumam Kathai Solgirathu was released on 23 December 1978. Kousigan of Kalki gave the film a negative review, primarily for its story. The film failed at the box office.

References

External links 
 

1970s Tamil-language films
Films directed by K. Shankar
Films scored by M. S. Viswanathan